The Baptist Missionary Association of America (BMAA) is a fellowship of Independent Baptist churches. Historically, churches within the BMAA have generally been associated with theological conservatism and the Landmarkism movement.

The association was formed as the North American Baptist Association in Little Rock, Arkansas in 1950, when it broke with the American Baptist Association over church representation matters. The Baptist Missionary Association of America adopted its current name in 1969. The majority of BMAA churches are concentrated in the Southern United States, but the association has churches across the United States and supports missions throughout the world. Most churches participate in local and state associations as well as the national/general body. However, each state and local association is autonomous. Foreign countries with churches that associate closely with BMAA churches generally also have a national association in their respective country. As of 2023, there were 1,129 congregations in the United States.

The BMAA owns the Baptist Missionary Association Theological Seminary, with campuses in Jacksonville, Texas, Conway, Arkansas, and online. The association also operates Lifeword Media Ministries and DiscipleGuide Church Resources, located in Conway, Arkansas.

The 2022 BMAA national meeting passed resolutions defining the organization as  pro-Christian Zionist,  anti-Gay rights,  anti-euthanasia, and called for the election of more  born-again Christians to public office.

See also
 Landmarkism
 Baptist Successionism
 Restorationism
 The Trail of Blood
 Southeastern Baptist College

References

External links
Baptist Missionary Association of America
Doctrinal Statement
BMAA Missions Department
Lifeword Broadcast Ministries Department
Profile of the Baptist Missionary Association of America on the ARDA website

Christian organizations established in 1950
Independent Baptist denominations in the United States
Baptist denominations established in the 20th century
1950 establishments in Arkansas